Christine Helen Dobson (born 24 November 1966) is an Australian former field hockey player who competed in the 1992 Summer Olympics.

References

External links
 

1966 births
Living people
Australian female field hockey players
Olympic field hockey players of Australia
Field hockey players at the 1992 Summer Olympics